North Macedonia competed at the 2022 Mediterranean Games in Oran, Algeria from 25 June to 6 July 2022.

Medals

Medalists

Swimming

Men

Taekwondo

North Macedonia won one medal in Taekwondo.

Wrestling

North Macedonia won two medals in wrestling.

References 

Nations at the 2022 Mediterranean Games
2022
2022 in North Macedonia sport